Kosogory is the name of several rural localities in Russia:

Kosogory, Ivanovo Oblast, village Furmanovsky District, Ivanovo Oblast
Kosogory, Republic of Mordovia, village in Bolshebereznikovsky District, Republic of Mordovia
Kosogory, Perm Krai, village in Permsky District, Perm Krai